Aeginina is a genus of amphipods in the family Caprellidae. There are at least 2 described species in Aeginina.

Species
 Aeginina aenigmatica Laubitz, 1972
 Aeginina longicornis (Krøyer, 1842) (long-horned skeleton shrimp)

References

Further reading

 McCain, John C. (1968). "The Caprellidae (Crustacea: Amphipoda) of the Western North Atlantic". United States National Bulletin, no. 278, 1–147.

Amphipoda